The 2002–03 season in the Honduran Liga Nacional was the 37th edition since the intervention of the professional league in Honduran football. The season was divided into two halves (Apertura and Clausura) which ran from August 2002 to June 2003.

2002–03 teams

 Real Maya changed its name to Real Patepluma for the Clausura tournament and moved to Santa Bárbara.

Apertura
The Apertura tournament lasted from August to December 2002, C.D. Olimpia defeated C.D. Platense in the Final to secure its 16th league title.

Regular season

Results
 As of 24 November 2002

Standings

Final round

Semifinals

Platense vs Real España

 Platense won 2–1 on aggregate score.

Olimpia vs Marathón

 Olimpia won 2–1 on aggregate score.

Final

Platense vs Olimpia

 Olimpia won 3–2 on aggregate.

Squads
Jose Gonzales

Top goalscorers
15 goals
  Marcelo Ferreira (Platense)
11 goals
  Luciano Emílio (Real España)
6 goals
  Denilson Costa (Olimpia)

Clausura
The Clausura tournament was played from February to June 2003. C.D. Marathón took revenge a year and a half later and defeated C.D. Motagua in the finals to claim its 4th league title.

Regular season

Results
 As of 10 May 2003

Standings

Final round

Semifinals

Olimpia vs Motagua

 Motagua won 4–2 on aggregate score.

Marathón vs Real España

 Marathón 2–2 Real España on aggregate score; Marathón advanced on better Regular season performance.

Final

Marathón vs Motagua

 Marathón won 4–1 on aggregate score.

Squads

Top goalscorers
10 goals
  Luciano Emílio (Real España)
  Pompilio Cacho (C.D. Marathón)
   Denilson Costa (C.D. Marathón)
8 goals
  Wilmer Velásquez (Olimpia)
6 goals
  Pedro Santana (Real España)
6 goals
  Jairo Martínez (Motagua)
  José Pacini (Marathón)
5 goals
  Danilo Tosello (Olimpia)
  Luis Oseguera (Motagua)
4 goals
  Emil Martínez (Marathón)
  Francisco Ramírez (Platense)
  Marcelo Ferreira (Olimpia)
  Abidán Solís (Motagua)
3 goals
  Clifford Laing (Platense)

Relegation
Relegation was determined by the aggregated table of both Apertura and Clausura tournaments. On 10 May 2003, C.D. Victoria were relegated to Liga de Ascenso, however they bought Honduras Salzburg's franchise and stayed in first division.

Controversies
During the Apertura tournament, C.D. Marathón hosted Real C.D. España on week 9, the match was played on 28 September and ended with a 0–2 away win to Real España.  During halftime, Real España delayed more than 15 minutes and returned late to play the second half.  Marathón alleged and the Board of Discipline annulled the game.  A rematch was played on 13 October ending in a 0–0 draw.  Such decision affected the final standings which resulted in Marathón owning the third place and sent Real España to fourth.

References

Liga Nacional de Fútbol Profesional de Honduras seasons
1
Honduras